John Lewis Whitehead (February 10, 1907 – August 9, 1988) was an American politician. The son of Congressman Joseph Whitehead, he represented Montgomery County and Radford in the Virginia House of Delegates for three terms until his defeat for reelection by Charlotte Giesen.

References

External links 

1907 births
1988 deaths
Democratic Party members of the Virginia House of Delegates
20th-century American politicians